VHS Collection is an American Indie rock/Synth-pop band from New York City that was formed in 2015 by Conor Cook, James Bohannon, and Nils Vanderlip.  The band has released 12 singles, 2 EPs, and 2 full-length albums as of February 25, 2022.  VHS Collection has performed at major music festivals including Lollapalooza, Austin City Limits, Governors Ball Music Festival, Bunbury Music Festival, Okeechobee Music & Arts Festival, and Firefly Music Festival. Several of their songs have been featured in TV shows including Shameless, Sunday Night Football, The Perfect Date, Fifa World Cup, You, WWE Raw, and Love. As of July 2019, VHS Collection's songs have been streamed over 150 million times on Spotify.  Three VHS Collection singles have charted on the Spotify Viral Charts (Lean, Waiting on the Summer, and Sign) and one single (Survive) has charted on the US Alternative Radio Charts.

Career
VHS Collection's three members have known each other since childhood.  Conor Cook and James Bohannon attended the same middle school in New York City, while James and Nils Vanderlip attended the same high school.

In 2015, VHS Collection began performing live at friends' parties and around NYC's Lower East Side rock clubs, eventually selling out multiple headline shows at the NYC's Mercury Lounge.  The band did not have any music out at this time, but had developed a sound at that fuses modern and retro sonics, made use of synthesizers and guitars, and blended electronic and alt-rock aesthetics.

In December 2015, the band independently released their self-titled debut EP.  The EP's single "Lean" was reviewed favorably by Consequence of Sound and rose to #8 on the Spotify Viral Charts in January 2016.  VHS Collection released their second EP Stereo Hype in 2016, which featured the singles Waiting on the Summer and Ghost.  The band performed at Lollapalooza and Austin City Limits that year and opened for Bloc Party. VHS Collection released more singles in 2017, as they worked on material for their debut album with producers Chris Zane (who has worked with Passion Pit and St. Vincent) and Tony Hoffer (who has produced and mixed artists like M83, Beck, and Phoenix).  On November 2, 2018, VHS released their debut album, Retrofuturism. The album has 12 songs and is reminiscent of 1980's music.  In 2019, the band embarked on the Retrofuturism Tour, with 24 dates across the United States and Canada.  In 2022, the band released its second full-length album, Night Drive, through PIAS.  Survive from the album spent three weeks on the US Alternative Radio Charts.  The band completed the Night Drive tour in July 2022 in the US, including a headline show at Brooklyn Steel.

All three members of the band are from New York. The band has been independent since its inception. The band is represented by CAA.  They started to experience success in 2018. The band has also released remixes from Viceroy, Penguin Prison, Fred Falke, and Dave Edwards.  The Dave Edwards Remix of Waiting on the Summer reached #1 on HypeMachine in April 2017.

The band released their second full-length album titled Night Drive on February 25, 2022.

Members
 James Bohannon - Vocals (2015–present)
 Conor Cook - Guitar, synths, producer (2015–present)
 Nils Vanderlip - Synths, guitars, producer (2015–present)

Discography

Albums

EPs

Singles

External links
Official website

Indie rock musical groups from New York (state)
Alternative rock groups from New York (state)
Musical groups from New York City
Musical groups established in 2014
Synthpop groups
Musical trios
2014 establishments in New York City